The Cielętniki Lime is a common lime tree at Cielętniki, in the south of Poland.

It is the largest tree in Poland by circumference. In 2014 the girth of the lime was 10.84 metres (0.7 m at its narrowest) and its height was 29.5 metres. The age of the tree, according to dendrochronological research, is 550 years.

This lime has a multi-stemmed, massive trunk, with a large crown spread. Its CBH (circumference at breast height) was 11.07 metres (in 2014). The lime grew from 18 small trees, planted many years ago by an unknown voivode, according to legend. The bark of the tree was believed to be a cure for toothache.  The church near the lime is dedicated to Saint Apollonia, who is a patron saint of stomatologists. The tree attracted pilgrims to the village, who bit the bark to heal their teeth.

The tree is now protected by a fence. It is a designated a natural monument.

See also
Bartek (oak)
Chrobry Oak
Witcher (tree)

References

Further reading 
 Paweł Zarzyński, Robert Tomusiak, Krzysztof Borkowski, Drzewa Polski, PWN, Warszawa, 2016, 
 Krzysztof Borkowski, Polskie drzewa, Wyd. DALPO, Poznań, 2014, 
 Paweł Zarzyński, Robert Tomusiak, 90 drzew – Okazy niezwykłe Centrum Informacyjne Lasów Państwowych, Warszawa, 2014, 

Landmarks in Poland
Natural monuments of Poland
Individual trees in Poland
Individual lime trees